Elizabeth Lewis Otey (1880–1974) was an American economist and suffragist.

Biography
Otey née Lewis was born on October 4, 1880, in Lynchburg, Virginia. She was the daughter of the suffragist Elizabeth Langhorne Lewis and John Henry Lewis. She attended Randolph-Macon woman's college and  Bryn Mawr College. She earned a doctorate in economics from the University of Berlin. She went on to author reports on labor and employment for the Bureau of Labor Statistics and the United States Department of Commerce and Labor.

In 1910 Otey became a member of the Lynchburg Equal Suffrage League, which was founded by her mother Elizabeth Langhorne Lewis. The same year she married Dexter Otey with whom she had one child.

Otey was a member of the Equal Suffrage League of Virginia as well as serving in the Congressional Union for Women Suffrage and the Virginia National Woman's Party. She marched in the 1913 Woman Suffrage Procession and in 1916 attended the Republican State Convention to advocate for the party's endorsement of woman suffrage.

After the ratification of the Nineteenth amendment in 1920 Otey ran for the statewide office of superintendent of public instruction. She won the Republican party's nomination, but lost the election. In 1931 Otey ran for the Virginia House of Delegates as a Socialist. In 1933 she ran for United States Senate, again as a Socialist against the incumbent Harry F. Byrd and lost.

Otey went on to work for the Social Security Administration and the Foreign Economic Administration. She retired in 1948.

Otey died on February 28, 1974, in Lynchburg.

In 2018 the Virginia Capitol Foundation announced that Otey's name would be on the Virginia Women's Monument's glass Wall of Honor.

References

External links 
 

1880 births
1974 deaths
American suffragists
American economists
United States Department of Labor officials
People from Lynchburg, Virginia
Randolph College alumni
Bryn Mawr College alumni
Humboldt University of Berlin alumni
American women economists